Tech Safe Systems was a Norfolk-based company that are specialists in the design, engineering and manufacturing of launch and recovery systems (LARS), control cabins, workshops for ROVs, and electric and hydraulic winches, most commonly in the deep water industries. It was acquired by Outreach Ltd in 2014.

History 
Tech Safe began in 1996 when a gap in the market was identified to provide a complete package of LARS, winches, cabins and workshops, integrated and tested with the customer’s ROV as a complete system. This ensured all the equipment worked together prior to going offshore. Outreach Ltd acquired Tech Safe Systems on 31 July 2014.

Sectors 
Tech Safe Systems operated both nationally and, for some of its products, internationally.
 Oil and Gas,
 Offshore Renewables,
 Marine,
 and University and Educational.

Products 
Tech Safe Systems operated across the United Kingdom and, for many of its products, across the world and are specialists in the design, engineering and manufacturing of: 
 Launch and Recovery Systems (LARS), 
 Control Cabins,
 Workshops for ROVs,
 and Electric/Hydraulic Winches.
most commonly in the deep water industries. These products begin life with Autodesk Product Design Suite.

Projects 
OWF Project in Wikinger offshore wind farm in the Baltic Sea. Tech Safe developed a Lloyd's Register Certified solution for large diameter drilling (LDD). This included a package of three winches and two control cabins to facilitate the command and control package for their pre-piling template and bubble curtain system.

References

External links 
 Official Website

Defunct manufacturing companies of England
Companies based in Norfolk
Manufacturing companies established in 1996
Manufacturing companies disestablished in 2014
2014 mergers and acquisitions
2014 disestablishments in England